Hans Christian Brevig  (21 September 1904 – 15 October 1974) was a Norwegian farmer and politician.

He was born in Vestby to Johan H. Brevig and Maren Georgine Gulbrandsen. He was elected deputy representative to the Storting for several periods, 1950–1965 for the Agrarian Party and the Centre Party. He replaced Hans Borgen at the Storting August–September 1963, when Borgen was member of Lyng's Cabinet. Brevig served as mayor of Vestby for several periods between 1945 and 1964.

References

1904 births
1974 deaths
People from Vestby
Centre Party (Norway) politicians
Members of the Storting
Mayors of places in Akershus